The Royal Malaysian Navy Aviation  is the naval aviation branch of the Royal Malaysian Navy (RMN). It was based in Lumut, Perak and currently consisted of four squadron.

History
RMN aviation was unofficially formed in 1985 after nine of the RMN personnel graduated from flying school. Two years later, RMN purchased a batch of used Westland Wasp from Royal Navy as their first flying unit. The RMN aviation officially inaugurated on 11 May 1990 by the third Chief of Navy, Laksamana Madya Tan Sri Abdul Wahab Bin Haji Nawi and RMN aviation now officially known as the KD Rajawali.

RMN aviation moving further by acquiring the new assets and expanding their squadron to fulfil the modern tasks. This includes the acquisition of modern anti-submarine and anti-surface helicopter-Super Lynx, light attack and surface surveillance helicopter-Fennec and utility helicopter-AW139. RMN aviation also formed it first unmanned aerial vehicle (UAV) squadron by acquiring ScanEagle UAV.

Units
Currently, RMN aviation consisted of four squadron which is three squadron of helicopter: 501, 502 and 503. One squadron of unmanned aerial vehicle: 601.

 501 Squadron
Equipped with six units Super Lynx helicopter. The main roles of this squadron are to fulfil the anti-submarine and anti-surface warfare. The Super Lynx equipped with A244-S torpedoes for anti-submarine and Sea Skua missiles for anti-surface.

502 Squadron
Equipped with six units Fennec helicopter for surface surveillance and light attack roles. The Fennec equipped with Telephonics 1500 radar and FLIR LEO II for surveillance task. It can also be equipped with rocket launcher for light attack task.

503 Squadron 'Monoluku Momurias'
Equipped with three units AW139 helicopter.

601 Squadron
Equipped with ScanEagle UAV for surveillance duties.

Inventory

See also
Malaysian Army Aviation

References 

Royal Malaysian Navy
Naval aviation services
Aviation in Malaysia